Jamaica competed at the 1972 Summer Olympics in Munich, West Germany. 33 competitors, 21 men and 12 women, took part in 27 events in 6 sports.

Medalists

Athletics

Men's 800 metres
Byron Dyce
 Heat — 1:48.0 (→ did not advance)

Men's 1500 metres
Byron Dyce
 Heat — 3:45.9 (→ did not advance)

Men's 4 × 100 m Relay
Michael Fray, Donald Quarrie, Lennox Miller, and Horace Levy 
 Heat — DNS (→ did not advance)

Boxing

Cycling

Six cyclists represented Jamaica in 1972.

Individual road race
 Howard Fenton — did not finish (→ no ranking)
 Michael Lecky — did not finish (→ no ranking)
 Radcliffe Lawrence — did not finish (→ no ranking)
 Xavier Mirander — did not finish (→ no ranking)

Sprint
 Honson Chin
 Maurice Hugh-Sam

1000m time trial
 Howard Fenton
 Final — 1:12.64 (→ 26th place)

Tandem
 Honson Chin and Howard Fenton → 11th place

Individual pursuit
 Michael Lecky

Team pursuit
 Radcliffe Lawrence
 Howard Fenton
 Maurice Hugh-Sam
 Michael Lecky

Diving

Women's 3m Springboard
 Betsy Sullivan — 210.39 points (→ 29th place)

Sailing

Swimming

References

External links
Official Olympic Reports
International Olympic Committee results database

Nations at the 1972 Summer Olympics
1972 Summer Olympics
1972 in Jamaican sport